This is a list of cities and towns in the Argentine province of Chubut.

Aldea Apeleg
Cerro Cóndor
Comodoro Rivadavia
Dolavon
Esquel
Gaiman
José de San Martín
Lago Blanco
Lago Puelo
Lagunita Salada
Las Plumas
Los Altares
Paso de Indios
Paso del Sapo
Puerto Madryn
Puerto Pirámides
Rada Tilly
Rawson
Río Mayo
Río Pico
Sarmiento
Tecka
Telsen
Trelew
Trevelin
Veintiocho de Julio

 Cities, list of
Argentina geography-related lists